This is a list of Christian religious houses in Germany, both extant and dissolved, and for either men or women (or both), arranged by state.

Christian monasteries (religious houses) in Germany arranged by state

Baden-Württemberg
Beuron Archabbey
 See also: Campus Galli - a project to construct a faithful medieval town with a monastery, based on the Plan of Saint Gall; in Meßkirch, Baden-Württemberg

Bavaria

Beuerberg Abbey (Kloster Beuerberg), formerly a monastery of the Augustinian Canons, is now the Monastery of the Visitation, Beuerberg, in Eurasburg.
Münsterschwarzach Abbey

Berlin
see Brandenburg

Brandenburg
see List of Christian monasteries in Brandenburg. This list also includes Berlin.

Bremen
see Lower Saxony

Hamburg
see Schleswig-Holstein

Hesse
 Eberbach Abbey, Eltville
 Eibingen Abbey, Rüdesheim
 Kloster Gnadenthal, Hünfelden
see List of Christian monasteries in Hesse

Lower Saxony
see List of Christian monasteries in Lower Saxony. This list also includes Bremen.

Mecklenburg-Vorpommern
see List of Christian monasteries in Mecklenburg-Vorpommern

North Rhine-Westphalia
see List of Christian monasteries in North Rhine-Westphalia

Rhineland-Palatinate
see List of Christian monasteries in Rhineland-Palatinate. This list also includes Saarland.

Saarland
see Rhineland-Palatinate

Saxony
see List of Christian monasteries in Saxony

Saxony-Anhalt
see List of Christian monasteries in Saxony-Anhalt

Schleswig-Holstein
see List of Christian monasteries in Schleswig-Holstein. This list also includes Hamburg.

Thuringia
see List of Christian monasteries in Thuringia

See also
List of Carolingian monasteries
List of Imperial abbeys
 Monasteries in the Archbishopric of Bremen

Sources
 Sterba, Thomas, 2010: Herders Neues Klösterlexikon. Herder-Verlag.

External links
 Orden.de: information on extant religious houses in Germany